Conus scalarispira is a species of sea snail, a marine gastropod mollusc in the family Conidae, the cone snails, cone shells or cones.

These snails are predatory and venomous. They are capable of "stinging" humans.

Description
The size of the shell varies between 9 mm and 11 mm.

Distribution
This marine species occurs of Southern Madagascar.

References

  Luigi Bozzetti, Pseudolilliconus scalarispira n.sp.; Malacologia Mostra Mondiale vol. 76 July 2012
 Puillandre N., Duda T.F., Meyer C., Olivera B.M. & Bouchet P. (2015). One, four or 100 genera? A new classification of the cone snails. Journal of Molluscan Studies. 81: 1-23

External links
 To World Register of Marine Species
 

scalarispira
Gastropods described in 2012